Ramiz Husić (born 1 October 1973) is a Bosnian professional football manager and former player.

Playing career

Club
Husić was signed by German second tier side Chemnitzer FC in summer 2000, but was released after some poor performances in the pre-season.

International
He made his debut for Bosnia and Herzegovina in an August 1999 friendly match away against Liechtenstein and has earned a total of four caps, scoring no goals. He did score a goal in an unofficial match though. His final international was an August 2001 LG Cup match against Iran.

Managerial career
After spending years as assistant coach at the club, Husić was appointed head coach of Rudar Kakanj in March 2021. He replaced Bećir Mehanović at the helm.

References

External links

Profile - NFSBIH

1973 births
Living people
People from Kakanj
Association football defenders
Bosnia and Herzegovina footballers
Bosnia and Herzegovina international footballers
FK Rudar Kakanj players
NK Šmartno ob Paki players
FK Budućnost Banovići players
Premier League of Bosnia and Herzegovina players
First League of the Federation of Bosnia and Herzegovina players
Slovenian PrvaLiga players
Bosnia and Herzegovina expatriate footballers
Expatriate footballers in Slovenia
Bosnia and Herzegovina expatriate sportspeople in Slovenia
Bosnia and Herzegovina football managers
FK Rudar Kakanj managers